Needham P. Yates (c. 1818 – March 1870) was a member of the Florida House of Representatives from 1860 to 1862.

He was the son of James Yates and Agnes Rowland.

He was the first Yates in the Shingle Creek community in 1847. His land was homestead land with the deed signed by president Franklin Pierce.

Barber–Mizell feud 
Needham was accused of killing Dave Mizell in Orange County, setting off the Barber–Mizell feud among the Mizells, Barbers, Yateses and Overstreets. Needham was shot dead, along with his sons, Needham and William, in the feud in 1870.

See also 
List of members of the Florida House of Representatives from Brevard County, Florida

References 

1818 births
1870 deaths
Deaths by firearm in Florida
Members of the Florida House of Representatives
People from Brevard County, Florida
People from Washington County, Georgia
19th-century American politicians